The Battle of Farrukhabad (14 November 1804) was an engagement during the Second Anglo-Maratha War between forces of the British East India Company and the forces of Yashwantrao Holkar of the Maratha Empire.

Battle
The battle took place at Farrukhabad in what is now Uttar Pradesh, India.

Lake "...attacked the Maratha camp where the soldiers were still sleeping off the effects of the previous night's revelry."  Holkar himself very narrowly escaped capture in the attack. The battle ended in a Maratha victory and the British forces were routed.

Geography
Farrukhabad is one of the three tehsils in the Farrukhabad District  of the State of  Uttar Pradesh in northern India.

Notes

References
Alison, Sir Archibald. History of Europe, Volume 11

Conflicts in 1804
Farrukhabad
Farrukhabad 1804
Farrukhabad 1804
Farrukhabad 1804
1804 in India
Farrukhabad district
November 1804 events